The Golden Calf (German: Das goldene Kalb) is a 1925 German silent drama film directed by Peter Paul Felner and starring Henny Porten, Olga Engl and Rosa Valetti.

The film's sets were designed by the art directors Otto Erdmann and Hans Sohnle.

Cast
 Henny Porten as Magdalena  
 Olga Engl as Frau Grahl  
 Rosa Valetti as Frau Huber  
 Angelo Ferrari as Nikolaus  
 Alfred Schreiber as Fiber  
 Colette Brettel as Judith  
 Johannes Riemann as Paulus  
 Ossip Runitsch as Leibgardist  
 Friedrich Kühne as Auditor 
 Albert Steinrück as Floris  
 Edgar Klitzsch as Waisenvater

References

Bibliography
 Grange, William. Cultural Chronicle of the Weimar Republic. Scarecrow Press, 2008.

External links

1925 films
1925 drama films
German drama films
Films of the Weimar Republic
Films directed by Peter Paul Felner
German silent feature films
German black-and-white films
Silent drama films
1920s German films
1920s German-language films